The El Cerro Tome Site is a site of petroglyphs and other prehistoric artifacts near Tome, New Mexico which was listed on the National Register of Historic Places in 1996.

References

Petroglyphs
Archaeological sites in New Mexico
National Register of Historic Places in Valencia County, New Mexico